Wrightia religiosa is a species of tree in the family Apocynaceae.  Its distribution includes: China (Guangdong), Indochina and Malaysia including the Philippines; no subspecies are listed in the Catalogue of Life.

This species is commonly a bonsai plant, used in pagodas of Indo-China and elsewhere. It produces small, pendulous white flowers that have a fragrance similar to true jasmine.

Gallery

References

External links 

religiosa
Flora of Indo-China
Plants used in bonsai
Trees of Vietnam